Mieczysław Walkiewicz (born 5 November 1949 in Nowa Wólka) is a Polish politician. He was elected to the Sejm on 25 September 2005, getting 4634 votes in 21 Opole district as a candidate from the Law and Justice list.

See also
Members of Polish Sejm 2005-2007

External links
Mieczysław Walkiewicz - parliamentary page - includes declarations of interest, voting record, and transcripts of speeches.

1949 births
Living people
People from Łęczna County
Members of the Polish Sejm 2005–2007
Law and Justice politicians